Godwin Robert James Withers (28 September 1884 –5 February 1976) was a British track and field athlete who competed in the 1908 Summer Olympics. In 1908 he was eliminated in the first round of the 10 mile walk competition.

References

External links

profile

1884 births
1976 deaths
English male racewalkers
Olympic athletes of Great Britain
Athletes (track and field) at the 1908 Summer Olympics
People from Soho
Athletes from London